Heston's Feasts is a television cookery programme starring chef Heston Blumenthal and produced by Optomen for Channel 4. The programme follows Blumenthal as he conceptualizes and prepares unique feasts for the entertainment of celebrity guests. The first series premiered on 3 March 2009, followed by a second series of seven episodes beginning in April 2010.

Summary
In each episode, Heston Blumenthal invites six celebrity guests to a four-course feast in which the dining room, food, and presentation are themed around a period of history. Blumenthal begins by researching the history, science and myth surrounding dishes of the past. He often experiments with exotic ingredients or tests unusual cooking techniques to remake historical dishes in his own style. Often, he will chase a lead and not serve the dish for various reasons such as impracticality or taste. In the dining room, Blumenthal presents each course with theatrics for the purpose of entertaining or even shocking his guests. The guests are different every episode and have included comedians, British nobility, and journalists.

Reception
In 2010, Heston's Feasts won the Royal Television Society Award for best features and lifestyle series.

Writing for The Guardian, TV critic Sam Wollaston praised the episode "Heston's Chocolate Factory Feast" as "an extraordinary cornucopia of joy and wizardry and humour."

List of episodes

Series one

Series two

Specials

References

External links

2009 British television series debuts
British cooking television shows